The 1932 United States Senate election in Maryland was held on November 8, 1932. Incumbent Democratic U.S. Senator Millard Tydings was re-elected to a second term in office, defeating Republican Wallace Williams.

Republican primary

Candidates
Linwood Clark, former U.S. Representative from Baltimore
Wallace Williams

Results

General election

Results

See also 
 1932 United States Senate elections

Notes

References 

 

Maryland
1932
United States Senate